R.I.P. is a live album by the punk rock band Murder City Devils, their last release before their 2006 reunion. It was recorded on October 31, 2001, at The Showbox in their home town of Seattle, and released in 2003 on Sub Pop.

Critical reception
Trouser Press called the album "as fierce as ever, a drunken sloppy mess of the sort to remind jaded fuckers of the awesome power of rock and roll." Exclaim! deemed it "an emotionally charged 62 minutes of music."

Track listing 
Bear Away	
I Drink The Wine	
One Vision Of May	
Midnight Service At The Mütter Museum	
I Want A Lot Now (So Come On)	
Rum To Whiskey	
Dancin' Shoes	
Waltz	
Dear Hearts	
That's What You Get	
Idle Hands	
Boom Swagger	
Dance Hall Music	
Cradle To The Grave	
Murder City Riot	
Press Gang	
Broken Glass	
18 Wheels	
Grace That Saves

References

2003 albums
Murder City Devils albums